In mathematical logic, interpretability is a relation between formal theories that expresses the possibility of interpreting or translating one into the other.

Informal definition
Assume T and S are formal theories. Slightly simplified, T is said to be interpretable in S if and only if the language of T can be translated into the language of S in such a way that S proves the translation of every theorem of T. Of course, there are some natural conditions on admissible translations here, such as the necessity for a translation to preserve the logical structure of formulas.

This concept, together with weak interpretability, was introduced by Alfred Tarski in 1953. Three other related concepts are cointerpretability, logical tolerance, and cotolerance, introduced by Giorgi Japaridze in 1992–93.

See also
 Interpretation (logic)
 Interpretation (model theory)
 Interpretability logic

References
 Japaridze, G., and De Jongh, D. (1998) "The logic of provability" in Buss, S., ed., Handbook of Proof Theory. North-Holland: 476–546.
 Alfred Tarski, Andrzej Mostowski, and Raphael Robinson (1953) Undecidable Theories. North-Holland.

Proof theory